The women's 3 metre springboard was part of the Diving at the 2006 Commonwealth Games program. The competition was held on 25 March 2006 at Melbourne Sports and Aquatic Centre in Melbourne, Australia.

Format
The competition was held in two rounds:
 Preliminary round: All 15 divers perform six dives, and the top 12 proceed to the final.
 Final: The 12 divers perform six dives; these are added onto the preliminary round scores and the top three divers win the gold, silver and bronze medals accordingly.

Schedule
All times are Australian Eastern Daylight Time (UTC+11).

Results
Results:

Green denotes finalists

References

Diving at the 2006 Commonwealth Games